The Samsung Ladies Masters was a women's professional golf tournament co-sanctioned by the LPGA of Korea Tour and the Ladies European Tour that took place in Singapore at the Laguna National G&CC. It was only held in 2005.

Winners 

Source:

References

External links
Ladies European Tour
LPGA of Korea Tour

Former Ladies European Tour events
LPGA of Korea Tour events
Golf tournaments in Singapore